The Grade Lutter is a river of Lower Saxony, Germany.

It is one of the two headstreams of the River Lutter in the South Harz. It rises at over 660 metres on the Aschentalshalbe. It then flows mainly in a southerly direction in order to merge with the Krumme Lutter near the district Kupferhütte of Bad Lauterberg to form the Lutter.

See also 
List of rivers of Lower Saxony

Sources 
Topographische Karte 1:25000, Nr. 4328 Bad Lauterberg im Harz

Rivers of Lower Saxony
Rivers of the Harz
Göttingen (district)
Rivers of Germany